J. D. Slater is an American gay pornography actor, director, and music composer from San Francisco who co-founded Raging Stallion Studios (RSS) with Chris Ward in 1999.

Awards and nominations
 2000 Grabby Awards – Best Video, nomination: All Sex – SexPack 2: A Kinky Twist (directors: Chris Ward and J. D. Slater)
 2003 GayVN Awards Hall of Fame
 2003 Grabby Awards Wall of Fame
 2004 HX Magazine, winner: Gorge
 2004 GayVN Awards – Best Soundtrack, nomination: A Porn Star is Born
 2004 GayVN Awards – Best Soundtrack, nomination: Gorge
 2004 GayVN Awards – Best Leather Video, nomination: Your Masters
 2006 GayVN Awards – Best Music, nomination: Arabesque
 2008 GayVN Awards – Best Music, nomination: Nekked Grunts
 2008, 14th Annual Hard Choice Awards, nomination: Erotikus
 2009 GayVN Awards – Best Bear, nomination: Centurion Muscle 5: Maximus (director: J. D. Slater)
 2009 GayVN Awards – Best Music, nomination: Nekked
 2009 GayVN Awards – Best Music, nomination: To The Last Man

References

External links 
 , including a partial list of his works.
 

Year of birth missing (living people)
American actors in gay pornographic films
American film score composers
American male film score composers
American pornographic film directors
Directors of gay pornographic films
Living people